William Sherman Jennings (March 24, 1863February 27, 1920) was an American politician. He served as the 18th Governor of Florida after being a lawyer, county judge, and state representative.

Early years and education
He was born near Walnut Hill, Illinois, and attended public schools in Marion County. Jennings graduated from Southern Illinois University in 1883, then studied law at the Union College of Law in Chicago (now named Northwestern University School of Law).  He finished his law studies in Chicago under the supervision of his brother, Charles E. Jennings, who was the State Attorney for Marion County.

Florida

He came to Florida in 1885 and settled in Brooksville, Florida. In 1887, he was appointed circuit court commissioner, and became county judge of Hernando County, Florida, in 1888.

State office
Jennings resigned his office as county judge in 1893 to serve in the Florida House of Representatives, eventually becoming Speaker of the Florida House of Representatives in 1895.
After his term ended, he served as a colonel in the Florida militia, was president of the Brooksville town council and chairman of the Democratic committee.
Jennings campaigned for and was elected governor in 1900, taking the oath of office on January 8, 1901. During his term in office, he introduced the statewide primary election system, replacing the previous method of nominating candidates for political office at a convention. The first statewide primary election was conducted in 1902. It was also Jennings idea to drain and develop the Everglades by cutting the natural rock dams in the rivers of south Florida. His term ended on January 3, 1905.

Remaining years
He moved to Jacksonville, then Florida's largest city, where he established a successful law practice. He divided his time between a home in Jacksonville and a farm and timber holdings in Clay County near Middleburg.

In 1905, he was appointed by Governor Napoleon B. Broward as general counsel for the Internal Improvement Fund, the state agency responsible for administering public lands. The new governor also favored the development of the Everglades, so in this position, which Jennings held until 1909, he was able to continue leading drainage activities in the Everglades.

Family
Jennings met May Mann at her father's home near Brooksville, and began a courtship. May's father, Austin Mann, had been a Florida Senator and had just won election to the state house of representatives. When the legislative session began in January, 1891, May went to Tallahassee to serve as her father's aide, with responsibility for her father's appointments, correspondence and hosting social events.
Jennings went to Tallahassee to continue his courtship. He married May Mann on May 12, 1891, and they were escorted down the aisle by the full legislative membership. The newlyweds lived in Brooksville in the William Sherman Jennings House. The couple had one child, a son, Sherman Bryan Jennings.

Politics and the law were prominent in his family. In addition to his brother, who was a lawyer and state attorney, he was a first cousin to William Jennings Bryan, congressman and three-time Democratic presidential nominee.

Civic activities
Jennings served as a trustee of Stetson University during the first decade of the twentieth century and was involved in the controversy over whether the Florida Baptist Convention would elect the trustees of the university.  At one point, the controversy became so heated that Jennings and Lincoln Hulley, the president of the university, engaged in a fistfight in the lobby of the Leon Hotel in Tallahassee, Florida.

Death
Jennings died on February 27, 1920, in St. Augustine, Florida, and was buried in Jacksonville, Florida.

Legacy and honors
The World War II Liberty Ship  was named in his honor.

References

External links
Official Governor's portrait and biography from the State of Florida

1863 births
1920 deaths
Democratic Party governors of Florida
Speakers of the Florida House of Representatives
Democratic Party members of the Florida House of Representatives
Florida lawyers
People from Jacksonville, Florida
People from Brooksville, Florida
William Jennings Bryan family
Southern Illinois University alumni
Northwestern University Pritzker School of Law alumni